Lierde is a municipality located in the Flemish Ardennes, the hilly southern part of the Belgian province of East Flanders in the Denderstreek. The municipality comprises the towns of Deftinge, Hemelveerdegem, Sint-Maria-Lierde and Sint-Martens-Lierde. In 2021, Lierde had a total population of 6,626. The total area is 26.13 km². Lierde borders to Brakel, Zottegem, Herzele and Geraardsbergen. Lierde is known for the Ronde van vlaanderen, a bike race where cyclists climb all the hills of the Flemish Ardennes.

References

External links

Official website 

 
Municipalities of East Flanders
Populated places in East Flanders